Wearhead is a village in County Durham, in England. It is situated at the top of Weardale between Cowshill and Ireshopeburn. It is named after the nearby source of the River Wear which runs eastwards for approx  to Sunderland. In the 2001 census Wearhead had a population of 210.

The first settlement at Wearhead may have been a farmstead, possibly a summer base for the Bishop's cattle which would
have been taken to lower ground in winter. East of the village lies a steep hillside, which has evidence of shallow shafts and hushes which were the early methods used to extract lead and iron. In County Durham there were rich deposits of lead lying within a circle of about 10 miles' radius drawn around Wearhead, hence the lead-mining industry of Weardale and Teesdale.

In 1858 the Post Office Directory listed: Beer Retailer, Grocer/Draper, Tailor/Draper, Grocer, Joiner/Postmaster, Grocer and Draper's/Joiner.

In 1915 the Post Office Directory listed only The Bank of Liverpool.

In 1971 Barclays Bank (formerly Martins Bank) was sold and the property became a butcher's shop, which has since closed.

In the construction six farms were submerged when water rose to fill the man-made reservoir in 1937.

Railways 

Wearhead was the terminus of the Weardale Extension Railway which opened on 21 October 1895. The line was mainly used for freight carrying limestone, iron ore, lead ore and fluorspar to the industrial areas of North East England. The station was host to a LNER camping coach from 1935 to 1939 and possibly one for some of 1934.  It closed to passenger traffic on 29 June 1953 and to goods on 2 January 1961.

Decline and revival
In 2005 the last remaining shop in the village, Co-op, closed. Shortly afterwards the Methodist Church held its last service after being in existence for over 180 years.

The former Co-op shop has re-opened as an independent village store and the former Post Office was opened as a craft shop/cafe. This has closed and been converted to a house since.

The houses of Wearhead are thought to be some of the most beautiful and original of Weardale.

There is a park and recreational field where the local teams play football.

What to Do 
Burnhope Reservoir
 A Mineral Valleys Project walk - Wearhead (The River Starts Here)
Killhope, the North of England Lead Mining Museum
The Weardale Museum and High House Chapel at Ireshopeburn

See also 
 List of closed railway stations in Britain

References

External links

 Old photos of Wearhead 1900s to 1960s on the Durham Record Web Site
 Wearhead Station Information
 Durham Dales: Walking and Cycling Routes in Wear Valley (PDF)
 The Weardale Way
 Weardale History

Villages in County Durham
Stanhope, County Durham